Gawan is a town and a nagar panchayat in Budaun district in the state of Uttar Pradesh, India.

Gawan may also refer to:

 Gawan block, Giridih district, Jharkhand, India
 Gawan, Giridih, Giridih district, Jharkhand, India
 An alternate spelling for Gawain, a Knight of the Round Table in Arthurian legend